Khorramabad Kahriz (also romanized as Khorramābād Kahrīz; also known as Kahrīz-e Khorramābād) is a village in Gilvan Rural District, in the Central District of Tarom County, Zanjan Province, Iran. At the 2006 census, its population was 557, in 130 families.

References 

Populated places in Tarom County